The Waverly Hills Sanatorium is a former sanatorium located in the Waverly Hills neighborhood of Louisville, Kentucky.

It opened in 1910 as a two-story hospital to accommodate 40 to 50 tuberculosis patients. In the early 1900s, Jefferson County was ravaged by an outbreak of tuberculosis – known as the "White Plague" – which prompted the construction of a new hospital. The hospital closed in 1961, due to the antibiotic drug streptomycin that lowered the need for such a hospital. There were original plans to turn the abandoned hospital into a hotel, but that is no longer the case.

History
The land that is known today as "Waverly Hill" was purchased by Major Thomas H. Hays in 1883 as the Hays' family home. Since the new home was far away from any existing schools, Mr. Hays decided to open a local school for his daughters to attend. He started a one-room schoolhouse on Pages Lane and hired Lizzie Lee Harris as the teacher. Due to Miss Harris' fondness for Walter Scott's Waverley novels, she named the schoolhouse Waverley School. Major Hays liked the peaceful-sounding name, so he named his property Waverley Hill. The Board of Tuberculosis Hospital kept the name when they bought the land and opened the sanatorium. It is not known exactly when the spelling changed to exclude the second "e" and became Waverly Hills. However, the spelling fluctuated between both spellings many times over the years.

Original sanatorium
In the early 1900s, Jefferson County was severely stricken with an outbreak of tuberculosis. There were many tuberculosis cases in Louisville at the time because of all the wetlands along the Ohio River, which were perfect for the tuberculosis bacteria. To try to contain the disease, a two-story wooden sanatorium was opened which consisted of an administrative/main building and two open air pavilions, each housing 20 patients, for the treatment of "early cases".

In the early part of 1911, the city of Louisville began to make preparations to build a new Louisville City Hospital, and the hospital commissioners decided in their plans that there would be no provision made in the new City Hospital for the admission of pulmonary tuberculosis, and the Board of Tuberculosis Hospital was given $25,000 to erect a hospital for the care of advanced cases of pulmonary tuberculosis.

On August 31, 1912, all tuberculosis patients from the City Hospital were relocated to temporary quarters in tents on the grounds of Waverly Hills pending the completion of a hospital for advanced cases. In December 1912 a hospital for advanced cases opened for the treatment of another 40 patients. In 1914 a children's pavilion added another 50 beds making the known "capacity" around 130 patients. The children's pavilion was not only for sick children but also for the children of tuberculosis patients who could not be cared for properly otherwise. This report also mentions that the goal was to add a new building each year to continually grow so there may have even been more beds available than specifically listed.

Sanatorium expansions
Due to constant need for repairs on the wooden structures, need for a more durable structure, as well as need for more beds so that people would not be turned away due to lack of space, construction of a five-story building that could hold more than 400 patients began in March 1924. The new building opened on October 17, 1926, but after the introduction of streptomycin in 1943, the number of tuberculosis cases gradually lowered, until there was no longer need for such a large hospital. The remaining patients were sent to Hazelwood Sanatorium in Louisville. Waverly Hills closed in June 1961.

Woodhaven Medical Services
The building was reopened in 1962 as Woodhaven Geriatric Center, a nursing home primarily treating aging patients with various stages of dementia and mobility limits, as well as the severely mentally handicapped. However, Woodhaven failed greatly because it was severely understaffed and overcrowded. Woodhaven also had reports over patient neglect and was closed by the state of Kentucky in 1982.

Prison
Simpsonville developer J. Clifford Todd bought the hospital in 1983 for $3,005,000. He and architect Milton Thompson wanted to convert it into a minimum-security prison for the state, but the developers dropped the plan after neighbors protested.

Statue
In March 1996, Robert Alberhasky bought Waverly Hills and the surrounding area. Alberhasky's Christ the Redeemer Foundation Inc. made plans to construct the world's tallest statue of Jesus on the site, along with an arts and worship center. The statue, which was inspired by the famed Christ the Redeemer statue on Corcovado Mountain in Rio de Janeiro, would have been designed by local sculptor Ed Hamilton and architect Jasper Ward. The second phase would convert the old sanatorium into a chapel, theater, and a gift shop at a cost of $8 million or more.

The plan to construct this religious icon fell through because donations to the project fell well short of expectations. In a period of a year, only $3,000 was raised towards the project despite efforts to pool money from across the nation. The project was canceled in December 1997.

Tunnel 
The tunnel served as a passageway to transport bodies and supplies in and out of the sanatorium. It was built on the first floor with the rest of the building. The corridor is 500 feet to the bottom of the hill and has a set of stairs on one side, which were the stairs used for the workers. On the other side, there was a cart that moved up and down the staircase which transported supplies and other necessities.

Since antibiotics did not exist in the time that the sanatorium was active, other forms of aid were used to treat TB patients. For example, heat lamps, fresh air, and positive talk and reassurance helped to keep patients alive, since the death rate of TB patients at the time was one death per day. However, at the peak of the disease, the sight of the dead being carried away in full view of the patients lowered the patient morale. Therefore, the sanatorium tried transporting the dead bodies as secretively as possible to increase the morale and lower the death rates, using the tunnel to that end. The doctors and workers of this time also believed that this would help to lower the disease's spreading rate.

Hence, the tunnel was also known as the "Body Chute" or "Death Tunnel" by the locals and paranormal investigators visiting the sanatorium.

Apart from transporting dead bodies out of the sanatorium, the tunnel also served as a temporary air raid shelter during World War II.

Restoration
After Alberhasky's efforts failed, Waverly Hills was sold to Tina and Charlie Mattingly in 2001. The Mattinglys hold tours of Waverly Hills and host a haunted house attraction each Halloween, with proceeds going toward restoration of the property. They're also currently restoring all the windows in the decrepit building while restoring the interior of the old sanatorium.

Sounds of the Underground Music Festival
Waverly Hills Sanatorium hosted the last show of the touring music festival Sounds of the Underground on August 11, 2007.  The show featured prominent acts in the extreme metal and metalcore scene, including Job for a Cowboy, The Acacia Strain, Hatebreed, Shadows Fall, Chimaira, GWAR, Cameo, Lamb of God and The Number Twelve Looks Like You. Similar festivals or concerts will likely not happen again at the Waverly Hills Sanatorium, due to complaints made by local residents.

Today 
The old sanatorium is currently owned by Charlie and Tina Mattingly. The couple purchased the site for $230,000 in 2001 in hopes of restoring the sanatorium and turning it into a local tourist site. Together with volunteers from Waverly Hills Historical Society, the group now runs regular historical and ghost tours all year round.

In popular culture
Waverly Hills has been popularized on the television show Ghost Hunters as being one of the "most haunted" hospitals in the eastern United States.
The sanatorium was featured on ABC/FOX Family Channel's Scariest Places on Earth, VH1's Celebrity Paranormal Project, Syfy's Ghost Hunters, Zone Reality's Creepy, the British show Most Haunted, Paranormal Challenge, Ghost Adventures on Travel Channel, and in episode 18 ("The Bull and the Beautiful") of season 3 of Animal Planet's series Call of the Wildman. It was also featured on paranormal shows Ghost Asylum and Paranormal Lockdown; both on Destination America.  It was also mentioned on The CW's show Supernatural in season 11, episode 23, "Alpha and Omega".
Ryan Bergara and Shane Madej from the web-series Buzzfeed Unsolved visited the location in season 2 for one of their supernatural episodes. They later revisited it for the series premiere of Ghost Files, a similar series hosted on their independent Watcher channel.
The Travel Channel's television show Destination Fear filmed at the location for the first episode of their third season.
Waverly Hills Sanatorium is the subject of the fifth episode of the season 3 of Kindred Spirits.
The sanatorium is featured in the first part of the three-part "Curse of the Underground Worlds" episode of the Science Channel's TV series Mysteries of the Abandoned, first aired on January 4, 2021.

See also
 List of attractions and events in the Louisville metropolitan area
 List of reportedly haunted locations in the United States
 National Register of Historic Places listings in Jefferson County, Kentucky

References

https://www.travelchannel.com/interests/haunted/articles/inside-the-haunted-halls-of-waverly-hills-sanitorium

External links

 The Waverly Hills Historical Society
 Waverly Hills Sanatorium at Abandoned
 Waverly Hills Sanatorium/Woodhaven Geriatric Center Memorial & Historical Resource
 Vintage aerial photo
 Waverly Hills Sanatorium on Kentucky Life, Kentucky Educational Television

Hospital buildings completed in 1910
Hospitals established in 1910
Defunct hospitals in Kentucky
Reportedly haunted locations in Kentucky
National Register of Historic Places in Louisville, Kentucky
Unused buildings in Kentucky
Tuberculosis sanatoria in the United States
Hospital buildings on the National Register of Historic Places in Kentucky
1910 establishments in Kentucky
1961 disestablishments in Kentucky
1962 establishments in Kentucky
1982 disestablishments in Kentucky
Hospitals disestablished in 1961